
Strzelin County  is a unit of territorial administration and local government (powiat) in Lower Silesian Voivodeship, south-western Poland. It came into being on January 1, 1999, as a result of the Polish local government reforms passed in 1998. Its administrative seat is the town of Strzelin, and its only other town is Wiązów.

As of 2019 the total population of the county is 43,713, out of which the population of Strzelin is 12,460, that of Wiązów is 2,241, and the rural population is 29,012.

Neighbouring counties
Strzelin County is bordered by Wrocław County to the north, Oława County to the north-east, Brzeg County to the east, Nysa County to the south, Ząbkowice Śląskie County to the south-west and Dzierżoniów County to the west.

Administrative division
The county is subdivided into five gminas (two urban-rural and three rural). These are listed in the following table, in descending order of population.

References

 
Land counties of Lower Silesian Voivodeship